Khatanga may refer to:
Khatanga, Russia, a rural locality (a selo) in Krasnoyarsk Krai, Russia
Khatanga, West Bengal, gram panchayat in India
Khatanga Airport, an airport in Krasnoyarsk Krai
Khatanga (river), a river in Krasnoyarsk Krai, Russia
Khatanga Gulf, a gulf at the Taymyr Peninsula

See also
Katanga (disambiguation)